Christopher Gerard Cavoli is a United States Army general who serves as the commander of United States European Command since 1 July 2022 and Supreme Allied Commander Europe since 4 July 2022. He previously served as the commanding general of United States Army Europe and Africa from October 2020 to June 2022, and before that as the commanding general of United States Army Europe from January 2018 to September 2020. 

Commissioned into the infantry from the Reserve Officers' Training Corps, Cavoli served in the War in Afghanistan and commanded a brigade of the 1st Armored Division, the 7th Army Joint Multinational Training Command, and the 25th Infantry Division before assuming command of USAREUR in January 2018.

Early years
Born to an Italian-American army officer during the Cold War in Würzburg, West Germany, Cavoli grew up in Rome, Verona, Vicenza, and Giessen. He graduated from Princeton University with an A.B. in biology in 1987. As part of his undergraduate degree, Cavoli completed a 22-page senior thesis titled "The Effect of Earthworms on the Vertical Distribution of Slime Molds in the Soil."

Military career
Cavoli was commissioned into the Infantry from the Reserve Officers' Training Corps at Princeton. He was first assigned as a second lieutenant to the 3rd Battalion, 325th Airborne at Vicenza from 1988 to 1991. 

Cavoli was promoted to captain and served as an instructor at Ranger School between 1992 and 1994.

He entered the Russian Foreign Area Officer program in 1995, and graduated from Yale University with a Master of Arts in Russian and East European Studies in 1997.

Combat in Bosnia
In 1999, he became chief of future operations for the 10th Mountain Division as a major and deployed to Bosnia with Implementation Force, before serving as an infantry battalion operations officer between 2000 and 2001.

NDU professor of Russian studies
As a lieutenant colonel, Cavoli served successively as Director for Russia on the Joint Staff Strategic Plans and Policy Directorate from 2001, as deputy executive assistant for the Chairman of the Joint Chiefs of Staff from 2003, and became a senior fellow at the National Defense University in 2004.

Deployment to Afghanistan
Cavoli became commander of the 1st Battalion, 32nd Infantry Regiment of the 3rd Brigade Combat Team, 10th Mountain Division in 2005. The battalion deployed to Kunar Province during the War in Afghanistan with the brigade in 2006. He then commanded the 3rd Brigade Combat Team, 1st Armored Division, in addition to serving as the deputy commander of Regional Command West in Herat during the War in Afghanistan.

Cavoli also served as the director of the Coordination Group of the Chief of Staff of the United States Army. 

He has held fellowships at the National Defense University, the George C. Marshall Center for European Security Studies in Garmisch-Partenkirchen, and the Strategic Studies Group of the Army Chief of Staff.

Service in Germany
 

After serving as deputy commanding general for operations of the 82nd Airborne Division, Cavoli became commander of the 7th Army Joint Multionational Training Command at Grafenwoehr Training Area in July 2014.

He was assigned to command the 25th Infantry Division on 25 March 2016, and officially assumed command in a ceremony on 4 August. He was confirmed by the Senate for promotion to major general on 26 May 2016.

Command of US Army Europe
He assumed command of United States Army Europe in a ceremony on 18 January 2018 after being confirmed by the Senate for promotion to lieutenant general on 20 December 2017.

On 1 July 2020, Cavoli was nominated and confirmed by the Senate on 30 September 2020, for appointment to the rank of general, and assignment as the commanding general of United States Army Europe and Africa, combining the originally separate Army commands. He assumed his new command in Germany on 1 October 2020 and was formally promoted by Army Vice Chief of Staff Joseph M. Martin at the Pentagon on 7 October,  with an effective date-of-rank on 1 October.

Defender-Europe 21, one of the largest U.S.-Army, NATO-led military exercises in Europe in decades, began in mid-March 2021 and lasted until June 2021. It included "nearly simultaneous operations across more than 30 training areas" in Estonia, Bulgaria, Romania, Kosovo  and other countries. Cavoli said that "While we are closely monitoring the COVID situation, we’ve proven we have the capability to train safely despite the pandemic."

SACEUR
In May 2022, his nomination to succeed General Tod Wolters as commander of United States European Command and Supreme Allied Commander Europe was approved by the Senate. He assumed command on 4 July 2022. Secretary-General of NATO Jens Stoltenberg took the opportunity to remark on his "entirely new family of NATO defence plans" which had been approved at the 2022 NATO Madrid summit and said "You were quite simply the right leader, at the right post, at the right time."

Awards and decorations

Personal life
Cavoli is married to Christina (née Dacey) of Fairfax, Virginia, and have two sons, Alex and Nick. A speaker of French, Italian, and Russian, he is a Foreign Area Officer with a concentration on Eurasia.

References

External links

|-

1960s births
United States Army Infantry Branch personnel
Living people
United States Army personnel of the Gulf War
United States Army personnel of the War in Afghanistan (2001–2021)
Princeton University alumni
Recipients of the Defense Superior Service Medal
Recipients of the Distinguished Service Medal (US Army)
Recipients of the Legion of Merit
United States Army generals
United States Army Rangers
Yale Graduate School of Arts and Sciences alumni
NATO Supreme Allied Commanders